Sam Abbas (Arabic: سام عباس; born 11 November 1993) is an Egyptian film director, screenwriter, and producer. He is noted for his artfully composed, poetic, and incident-like tableaus film style.

Career
Prior to his first feature, Abbas's short film Time to Come was labeled as "a really powerful project," by LogoTV.

In 2018, Abbas executive produced Lavender by Matthew Puccini which screened at the 2019 Sundance Film Festival followed by the 2019 SXSW. The film was immediately picked up by Fox Searchlight Pictures, making it one of the first films bought at Sundance that year.

The Hollywood Reporter exclusively released the trailer for Abbas' first full-length feature, The Wedding, in August 2018. Immediately after the trailer's release, the film was called, "the queer movie that could make waves in the Middle East" and "a film that will make a fuss in theaters". In November 2018 the film was released theatrically and secretly throughout the Middle East.

Abbas' Alia's Birth, his second full-length feature, received attention following the announcement of a female-driven short film contest in which the winner gets to have their film included within the narrative. The film stars Nikohl Boosheri, Poorna Jagannathan, Samuel H. Levine and Maya Kazan.

On July 13, 2020, Abbas released a 2.5 minute short documentary, Rusted Caravaggios, about the first public invitation to the Louvre Museum (Monday July 6, 2020) following an unprecedented four-month closure.

Shortly after Variety Magazine revealed that Abbas had teamed with leading cinematographers from around the world to create the documentary Erēmīta (Anthologies). The anthology of shorts composed during the 2020 pandemic was both produced and curated by Abbas.

ArabQ 
In 2018 Abbas launched ArabQ, the first Arab-based film production company focusing on movies with LGBTQ themes, during the 68th Berlin International Film Festival. ArabQ launched with Abbas' feature film debut, The Wedding, which he wrote, directed, and starred in alongside Nikohl Boosheri.
Abbas placed the company in Egypt to encourage more queer cinema with Middle East ties.

The company closed in 2020.

Filmography

Film

References

External links

 
 
 

1993 births
Living people
21st-century Egyptian actors
21st-century Egyptian writers
Egyptian film directors
Egyptian male film actors
Egyptian screenwriters
Queer actors
Queer screenwriters
Writers from Alexandria